The Half Moon Bay Stakes is an American ungraded stakes race for Thoroughbred horses held on the grass at Golden Gate Fields in Albany, California.  For fillies and mares, three-year-olds and up, it is run at a distance of eight and a half furlongs on the turf and offers a purse of $50,000.

The Half Moon is named for a small bay on the coast below San Francisco famous for its pumpkins, as well as a recently discovered monster surf wave called the "Maverick".

Past winners

 2006 - Private Banking
 2005 - Strong Faith
 2004 - (Not run due to cutbacks?)
 2003 - Blue Blood Boot
 2002 - World Light
 2001 -
 2000 - Heritage of Hall
 1999 - Wind Tunnel
 1998 - Highland Gold (raced at Bay Meadows)

External links
 Golden Gate Fields website

Horse races in California
Ungraded stakes races in the United States
Sports in the San Francisco Bay Area
Turf races in the United States
Golden Gate Fields